Simidicca, was a Roman era civitas of the Roman province of ' Africa Proconsolare.

The ancient city is tentatively identified with ruins at Henchir-Simidia Tunisia.

The city was also the seat of an ancient Christian bishopric, suffragan of' Archdiocese of Carthage.   Only one bishop of this diocese is known Adeodatus, a Catholic bishop who participated in the Conference of Carthage of 411, which saw gathered together the bishops Catholics and Donatists in Roman Africa; the headquarters at that time had no Donatist bishops.  The same Adeodatus was present at the Council of Carthage (419) held by St Aurelius.  Today the diocese survives as titular bishopric and the current bishop is Rumen Stanev, of Sofia.

References

Former populated places in Tunisia
Roman towns and cities in Africa (Roman province)
Catholic titular sees in Africa